The World War I 16th Street Memorial Trees, honoring the lives of District of Columbia residents lost in World War I, is located on 16th Street NW in Washington, D.C. between Alaska Avenue and Varnum Street. It originally consisted of more than 500 trees and markers representing the D.C. men and women who died in conflict.

Dedication

The 16th Street Memorial Trees were a gift to the city from the D.C. department of the American Legion. Norway Maple trees were planted approximately 40 feet apart along the 2.5-mile stretch of 16th Street NW between Alaska Avenue and Varnum Street. Each tree is accompanied by a small concrete marker with a bronze plate. The markers are approximately 6-8" tall, with a sloping top and the name of the deceased engraved on a bronze plate. The plates bore the dead soldier's name, their branch of service, and the words "Memorial Tree, World War, 1917-18." The 507 markers are arranged in alphabetical order, starting with Edward D. Adams in the north and ending with Randolph T. Zane to the south. At least 6 of the markers are dedicated to women who perished in the war.

The memorial was dedicated on Sunday, May 30, 1920 at 4:00pm. The ceremony consisted of a parade by the American Legion and other veteran organizations, with music performed by the United States Marine Band. Assistant Secretary of War Benedict Crowell and District Commissioner Louis Brownlow made brief addresses and approximately 10,000 District residents were in attendance.

Early Decades and Later Neglect

By 1922 the total number of trees comprising the memorial had increased to 533. In the years following the dedication and into the 1950s, the trees were decorated and the street was a gathering point for Memorial Day celebrations and remembrances. The closely planted tree canopy created an attractive passage into downtown Washington, coinciding with active development along 16th Street in the 1920s and 30s.

However, it was not long before the markers and trees began to fall victim to automobile accidents, theft, unintentional damage due to utility and landscape maintenance, and general indifference. The American Legion set up slot machines in federal buildings to fund maintenance of the memorials, but a legal ruling in the 1950s banned such machines. The Legion's budget priorities fell elsewhere in subsequent decades, on projects such as the Vietnam Veterans Memorial and the World War II Memorial, and little attention was paid to the World War I memorial trees and markers.

As of 1982, only about three dozen trees remained, many of them not originals but saplings planted as replacements for lost trees. While several dozen concrete columns were still present, only one bronze marker could be located.

By 2000, the remaining concrete markers were largely flush with the earth and obscured by grass, and very few bronze markers remained.

Present Day

As of 2010 only two bronze markers remained, those of Leo Joseph and Private John Kendall. A ceremonial resolution was introduced by Phil Mendelson and passed by the Council of the District of Columbia on May 4, 2010, recognizing the 90th Anniversary of the memorial's dedication and calling upon stakeholders to rededicate the memorial on its centennial, May 31, 2020.

References

World War I memorials in the United States
History of Washington, D.C.
Monuments and memorials in Washington, D.C.